Lower Silesia (Silesian German: Niederschläsing) is the northwestern part of the historical and geographical region of Silesia; Upper Silesia is to the southeast.

In the Middle Ages Lower Silesia was part of Piast-ruled Poland. It was one of the leading regions of Poland, and its capital Wrocław was one of the main cities of the Polish Kingdom. Lower Silesia emerged as a distinctive region during the fragmentation of Poland, in 1172, when the Duchies of Opole and Racibórz, considered Upper Silesia since, were formed of the eastern part of the Duchy of Silesia, and the remaining, western part was since considered Lower Silesia. During the Ostsiedlung, German settlers were invited to settle in the sparsely populated region, which until then had a Polish majority. As a result, the region became largely Germanised in the following centuries.

In the late Middle Ages the region fell under the overlordship of the Bohemian Crown, however large parts remained under the rule of local Polish dukes of the Piast dynasty, some up to the 16th and 17th century. Briefly, under the suzerainty of the Kingdom of Hungary, it fell to the Austrian Habsburg monarchy in 1526.

In 1742, Austria ceded nearly all of Lower Silesia to the Kingdom of Prussia in the Treaty of Berlin, except for the southern part of the Duchy of Nysa. Within the Prussian kingdom, the region became part of the Province of Silesia. In 1871, Lower Silesia was integrated into the German Empire. After World War I, the region became a separate province within the Weimar Republic.

After 1945, the main part of the former Prussian province fell to the Republic of Poland, while a smaller part west of the Oder-Neisse line remained within East Germany and historical parts of Austrian Lower Silesia (Jesenicko, Opavsko regions) remained as a part of Czechoslovakia. By 1949, almost the entire pre-war German population was expelled.

The region is known for an abundance of historic architecture of various styles, including many castles and palaces, well preserved or reconstructed old towns, numerous spa towns, and historic burial sites of Polish monarchs and consorts (in Wrocław, Legnica and Trzebnica).

Geography 

Lower Silesia is located mostly in the basin of the middle Oder River with its historic capital in Wrocław.

The southern border of Lower Silesia is mapped by the mountain ridge of the Western and Central Sudetes, which since the High Middle Ages formed the border between Polish Silesia and the historic Bohemian region of the present-day Czech Republic. The Bóbr and Kwisa rivers are considered being the original western border with the Lusatias, however, the Silesian Duchy of Żagań reached up to the Neisse river, including two villages (Pechern and Neudorf) on the western shore, which became Silesian in 1413.

The later Silesian Province of Prussia further comprised the adjacent lands of historic Upper Lusatia ceded by the Kingdom of Saxony after the Napoleonic Wars in 1815, its westernmost point could be found as far west as the small village of Lindenau (now belonging to the German state of Brandenburg). To the north, Lower Silesia originally stretched up to Świebodzin and Krosno Odrzańskie, which was acquired by the Margraves of Brandenburg in 1482. The Barycz river forms the border with historic Greater Poland in the northeast, the Upper Silesian lands lie to the southeast.

Administratively Polish Lower Silesia is shared between Lower Silesian Voivodeship (except for the Upper Lusatian counties of Lubań and Zgorzelec, and former Bohemian Kłodzko), the southern part of Lubusz Voivodeship (i.e. the counties of Krosno Odrzańskie, Nowa Sól, Świebodzin, Żagań and Zielona Góra with the city of Zielona Góra, as well as western Opole Voivodeship (the counties of Brzeg, Namysłów and Nysa).

The tiny part of the former Duchy of Żagań on the western shore of the Neisse is today part of the Krauschwitz municipality in the Görlitz district of Saxony, the larger Upper Lusatian parts of Prussian Silesia ("Silesian Upper Lusatia") west of the Neisse comprised the town of Görlitz and the former district of Hoyerswerda, which today forms the northern part of the Saxon Görlitz and Bautzen districts as well as the southern part of the Oberspreewald-Lausitz district in Brandenburg. The southern part of the former Duchy of Nysa, which fell to Austrian Silesia in 1742, namely the Jeseník District and Heřmanovice, Mnichov and Železná, as well as parts of Vrbno pod Pradědem in the Bruntál District, today belongs to the Czech Republic.

Sudetes 

They are topographically divided into Western, Central and Eastern Sudetes.

The Lower Silesian section of the Sudetes comprises the Jizera Mountains (highest peak: Wysoka Kopa), where the tripoint with Upper Lusatia and Bohemia is located near the Smrk summit, along with the adjacent Karkonosze Krkonoše (also known as in ) (highest: border peak of Sněžka Śnieżka – highest mountain of Czech Republic); Rudawy Janowickie (Skalnik); Owl Mountains (Wielka Sowa); Stone Mountains (Waligóra ); Wałbrzych Mountains (Borowa ) and the Kaczawskie Mountains (Skopiec) with Ostrzyca,  - they surround the Jelenia Góra valley, ; Ślęża Massif (Mount Ślęża ), massive of Orlické hory, Králický Sněžník south of historical Kladsko ), Rychlebské hory and Jeseníky (  (Praděd) .

Silesian Lowland 
The adjacent Silesian Lowland includes the Silesian Lowlands and the Silesian-Lusatian Lowlands. These two lowlands are separated with each other by Dolina Kaczawy, and from the Sudetes by a steep morphological edge located along the Sudeten Marginal Fault, extended from Bolesławiec (the Northwest) to Złoty Stok (the Southeast). The southern part of the Lowland includes The Sudeten Foreland, consisting of quite low Wzgórze Strzegomskie, Grupa Ślęży (Mount Ślęża), and Wzgórza Niemczańsko-Strzelińskie (Gromnik Mountain). Lower hills occur also in areas of Obniżenie Sudeckie, Świdnik, and Kotlina Dzierżoniowska. The eastern part of Silesian Lowland consists of the wide Silesian Lowlands, located along banks of the Oder River. The eastern part includes also Równina Wrocławska with its surrounding lands: Równina Oleśnicka, Wysoczyzna Średzka, Równina Grodkowska and Niemodlińska. Dolina Dolnej Kaczawy (Kotlina Legnicka) separates the Silesian Lowlands from the Silesian-Lusatian Lowlands, which includes Wysoczyzna Lubińsko-Chocianowska, Dolina Szprotawy, and wide areas of Bory Dolnośląskie, located to the north from the Bolesławiec-Zgorzelec road. The range of hills includes Wzgórza Dalkowskie, Wzgórza Trzebnickie, Wzgórza Twardogórskie, and Wzgórza Ostrzeszowskie. Obniżenie Milicko-Głogowskie, with Kotlina Żmigrodzka and Milicka, is located in the northern part, within the hills.

The region of the lowlands is coated with a thick layer of glacial elements (sand, gravel, clay) that covers more diverse relief of the older ground. Generally flat and wide bottoms of the valleys are padded with river settlements. The later form of the economy caused almost complete deforestation of the slopes. Not only fertile grounds, but also the mild climate is conductive to the development of agriculture and market gardening. The snow layer disappears after 45 days. The winds, similar to those appearing in the West side of Poland, are West and Southwest.

Sudeten rivers are characterized by changeable water rates, and high pollution resulting from large industrialization of the area. The greatest rivers are Nysa Kłodzka, which is the source of drinking water for Wrocław (the water is drawn by special channel); Stobrawa, Oława, Ślęza, Bystrzyca with its tributaries—Strzegomka and Piława; Widawa, Średzka Woda, Kaczawa with Nysa Szalona and Czarna Woda. There is also the largest right-bank tributary of the area, Barycz. The other quite large rivers, Bóbr, Kwisa, and Lusatian Neisse, flow into the Oder River beyond Lower Silesian borders. The majority of the rivers is regulated and their basins are improved, which is conductive to the proper water economy. The characteristic feature of the landscape of the lowland is the lack of lakes. The region of Legnica is the only place where a dozen or so of small lakes survived, but the majority of them is already disappearing. The largest one is Jezioro Kunickie, Jezioro Koskowickie, Jezioro Jaśkowickie and Tatarak. In contrast to the number of lakes, there are large groups of artificial ponds founded in the Barycz basin, in the Middle Ages.

The primeval flora has been transformed significantly as a result of deforestation and cultivation. The largest forest complexes are Bory Dolnośląskie, Bory Stobrawskie in Stobrawa and Widawa areas, and smaller fragments of forests in Barycz and Oder River valleys. These forests are kind of multi-species deciduous forests, occurring in fertile grounds. The Oder River valley is reach in groups of mixed forests (beech, oak, hornbeam, sycamore maple, and pine). These forests, with protected status, are: Zwierzyniec, Kanigóra near Oława, Dublany, Kępa Opatowicka near Wrocław, Zabór near Przedmoście, and Lubiąż. The other forest areas are The Natural Park in Orsk, the areas of Jodłowice, Wzgórze Joanny near Milicz, and Gola near Twardogóra. Such types of forest like those  which are the mainstay for wild game or nurseries, are inaccessible because of permanent fire hazard. Territories partly accessible (marked specially) are located in areas of Góra Śląska, Oborniki Śląskie, Wołowa, in the Oder River valley, and in Wzgórza Niemczańsko-Strzelińskie.

Flora 
The flora of Lower Silesia is specific and different for each zone. From the bottoms to the top, plants form groups that are arranged in wide or narrow belts, called floral zones. Subsequently, these zones are divided into narrower belts, called vegetation belts.

The zone of mountain forest is divided into two belts: subalpine and lower subalpine forest. Above, there is a forestless zone divided into the subalpine belt with dwarf pine, and the alpine belt without shrubs. This vegetation is glacial; the former vegetation—from the Tertiary—was destroyed by the climate of the Ice Age. Along with glaciation from the North, some tundra plants appeared, for example downy willow (Salix lapponum) and cloudberry (Rubus chamaemorus).
The flora of Lower Silesia is strongly influenced by geological and climatic history. The vegetation is formed by species deriving from various geographic regions. Particular regions are represented by:

 Central European species: fir (Abies alba), beech (Fagus silvatica), oak (Quercus petraea), maple (Acer pseudoplatanus)
 European Syberian species: European spindle-tree (Evonymus europaea), alder (Alnus glutinosa), wicker (Salix purpurea)
 Boreal-Sub arctic species: cress (Cardamine pratensis), yellow marsh marigold (Caltha palustris), liverleaf (Hepatica nobilis)
 Boreal-Arctic species: bearberry (Arctostaphylos uva-ursi), dwarf willow (Salix herbacea), black crowberry (Empetrum nigrum), Sudetic Lousewort (Pedicularis sudetica), alpine saxifrage (Micranthes nivalis), cloudberry (Rubus chamaemorus), lake quillwort (Isoëtes lacustris)
 Alpine species: Alpine bastard toadflax (Thesium alpinium), Alpine coltsfoot (Homogyne alpina), mountain avens (Geum montanum), mountain pine (Pinus mugo)
 Sudetic and Sudetic-Carpathian species: mossy saxifrage (Saxifraga moschata ssp. Basaltica), Sudetic lousewort (Pedicularis sudetica)

Lower subalpine forest 
Lower subalpine forest, is characterized by deciduous or mixed forest. The fragments of forests similar to natural complexes of pine-fir-beech with admixture of larch, sycamore maple and lime occur near the Szklarski waterfall, in the Jagniątkowski complex, and Chojnik Mountain. Particular species of trees have different climatic requirements.

Despite transformation of the basic tree vegetation, the same form of undergrowth survived. There occurs: daphne mezereum, red elderberry, hazel, platanthera bifolia, sweet woodruff, Herb Paris, cranberry, wood sorrel, chickweed wintergreen, Common Cow-wheat and lily of the valley. The parts over 800 m are mainly covered with grasses, purple small-reeds, cranberries, and willow gentian.

In highlighted places, on meadows, and along roads, there occurs: spotted orchid, bugleweed, yellow archangel, arnica montana, sword-leaved helleborine, rosebay willowherb, groundsel, and foxglove. Along riversides, there occurs white butterbur.

Pine forests are rich in spruces, which are permanently weakened by atmospheric factors. Frayed roots are easily infected by harmful fungus and insects. The most damaging is honey mushroom, with edible specimen, which grows in pulp, between the bark and timber, causing the death of tree. The other damaging fungus is bracket fungus, which destroys roots and trunks from the inside. The honey mushroom devastates the tree within a few months, and the bracket fungus, within a few years, as a result of mechanic changes in wood structure.

History

Ancient history 
At the close of the Ice Age, the first man appeared at the Silesian Lowland. In the Mesolithic (7,000 years ago), the first nomadic people settled in Lower Silesia, living in caves and primitive chalets. They were collectors, hunters, and fishers, and used weapons and other tools made of stone and wood. In the Upper Paleolithic, the oldest human remains of the nomadic people, which were 40,000 years old, were found in a tomb in Tyniec on the river Ślęża.

In the Neolithic (4000–1700 BC), began the process of transformation into a settled way of life. The first rural settlements were made, as people began to farm and breed animals. Mining, pottery, and weaving are dated to this period. Serpentinite quarries came into existence, of which Silesian hatchets were made, and near Jordanów Śląski, people extracted nephrite that was transformed into diverse tools. In the Bronze Age (1700–1500 BC), the evolution of different cultures developed to the existence of Unetice culture that affected the existence of Trzciniec culture. In the next periods since , it encompasses all of Europe.

Early history 
In the La Tène culture period, Lower Silesia was inhabited by the Celts, who had their main place of cult on the Mount Ślęża. Their stony statues situated on and around this hill were later worshipped by the Slavic tribes that came here around the sixth century AD. Magna Germania (second century) records that between the Celtic and the Slavic period, Lower Silesia was inhabited by a number of Germanic tribes. Among them, are the Vandals, the Lugii, and the Silingi, who might have given the Silesia region its name, though it is unclear and thus disputed. With the Germanic tribes leaving westward during the Migration Period, a number of new peoples arrived in Silesia from Sarmatia, Asia Minor, and the Asian steppes from the beginning of the sixth century.

The Bavarian Geographer referred to the West Slavic Ślężanie (the other possible source of the region's Śląsk and later Silesia name), centered on Niemcza, and Dziadoszanie tribes, while a 1086 document issued by Bishop Jaromir of Prague listed the Zlasane, Trebovane, Poborane, and Dedositze. At the same time, Upper Silesia was inhabited by the Opolanie, Lupiglaa, and Golenshitse tribes. In the late 9th century, the territory was subject to the Great Moravian realm of Prince Svatopluk I and from about 906 came under the rule of the Přemyslid duke Spytihnev I of Bohemia and his successors Vratislaus I, the alleged founder of Wrocław, and Boleslaus the Cruel.

Piast Kingdom of Poland 

Meanwhile, the West Slavic Polans had established the first duchy under the Piast dynasty in the adjacent Greater Polish lands in the north. About 990 Silesia was conquered and incorporated into the first Polish state by the Piast duke Mieszko I, who had gained the support of Emperor Otto II against the Bohemian duke Boleslaus II.

In 1000 his son and successor Bolesław I Chrobry founded the Diocese of Wrocław, which, together with the Bishoprics of Kraków and Kołobrzeg, was placed under the Archbishopric of Gniezno in Greater Poland, founded by Emperor Otto III at the Congress of Gniezno in the same year. The ecclesial suzerainty of Gniezno over Wrocław lasted until 1821. After a temporary shift to Bohemia in the first half of the 11th century, Lower Silesia continued to be an integral part of the Polish state until the end of its fragmentation period when all Polish claims on this land were finally renounced in favor of the Bohemian kingdom in 1348.

Various Polish defensive battles against the invading Germans took place in the region in the Middle Ages, including the victorious battles of Niemcza in 1017 and Głogów and Psie Pole in 1109. In the early 12th century, Wrocław was named one of the three major cities of the Polish Kingdom alongside Kraków and Sandomierz in the oldest Polish chronicle, Gesta principum Polonorum. One of the largest battles of medieval Poland, the Battle of Legnica, during the first Mongol invasion of Poland was fought in the region 1241.

Also a leading region of medieval Poland. The first-ever granting of town privileges in Polish history, happened there, when Złotoryja was granted such rights in 1211 by Henry the Bearded, and in the 13th century the Book of Henryków, a chronicle containing the oldest known text in Polish, was created in the region.

The Duchy of Silesia was first split into lower and upper parts in 1172 during the period of Poland's feudal fragmentation, when the land was divided between two sons of former High Duke Władysław II. The elder Bolesław the Tall ruled over Lower Silesia with his capital in Wrocław (then known as Vratislav, Wrotizla, or Prezla), and younger Mieszko Tanglefoot ruled over Upper Silesia with his capital at first in Racibórz, from 1202 in Opole. Later Silesia was divided into as many as 17 duchies. Main duchies of Lower Silesia:
 Silesia–Wrocław
 Legnica, split off in 1248
 Brzeg, split off from Legnica in 1311
 Świdnica-Jawor, split off from Legnica in 1274
 Ziębice, split off from Świdnica in 1321
 Głogów, split off from Legnica in 1251
 Żagań, split off from Głogów in 1274/1278
 Oleśnica, split off from Głogów in 1313
 Bierutów, split off from Oleśnica in 1412
 Krosno-Ścinawa
 Nysa, established in 1290

Polish duchies, Bohemian Crown, Hungary, Austria, and Prussia 

With the 1335 Treaty of Trentschin (Trenčín) and the 1348 Treaty of Namysłów, most of the Silesian duchies were ruled by the Silesian Piast dukes under the feudal overlordship of the Bohemian kings, and thus became part of the Crown of Bohemia within the Holy Roman Empire. Many duchies remained Polish-ruled under the houses of Piast, Jagiellon and Sobieski, some up to the 17th and 18th century. In 1469, Lower Silesia passed to Hungary, and in 1490 it fell back to Bohemia, then ruled by the Jagiellonian dynasty. In 1476, the Crossen district became part of the Margraviate of Brandenburg, when the widow of the Piast ruler, Barbara von Brandenburg, daughter of Elector Albert Achilles, inherited Crossen. It remained an important center of Polish culture.

In 1526 Silesia was acquired by Austria's Habsburg monarchy after the death of King Louis II of Bohemia. Brandenburg contested the inheritance, citing a treaty made with Frederick II of Legnica, but Silesia largely remained under Habsburg control until 1742. In 1675 Duke George William of Legnica died at the Brzeg Castle, as the last male member of the Piast dynasty, which founded the Polish state in the 10th century. He was buried in Legnica.

Most of Lower Silesia, except for the southern part of the Duchy of Nysa, became part of the Kingdom of Prussia after the First Silesian War by the 1742 Treaty of Breslau. In 1815, it became part of the Prussian Silesia Province, which was divided into the two Lower Silesian administrative regions (Regierungsbezirke) of Liegnitz and Breslau (sometimes also referred to as Middle Silesia), and Upper Silesian Oppeln (including the Lower Silesian districts of Neisse and Grottkau). The western Liegnitz region had been enlarged by the incorporation of the Upper Lusatian districts of Lauban, Görlitz, Rothenburg and Hoyerswerda, all seized from the Kingdom of Saxony after the Napoleonic Wars. From 1871, Lower Silesia was part of the German Empire.

As a result of long lasting German colonization and Germanisation, by the beginning of the 20th century Lower Silesia had a majority German-speaking population, with the exception of a small Polish-speaking area in the northeastern part of the district of Namslau (Namysłów), Groß Wartenberg (Syców) and Militsch (Milicz) and a Czech-speaking minority in the rural area around Strehlen (Strzelin). There were also Polish communities in large cities such as Breslau (Wrocław) and Grünberg (Zielona Góra). After the First World War, the bulk of Lower Silesia remained within Germany, the Bohemian part was included within Czechoslovakia, and a small part was reintegrated with Poland, which just regained independence. The German part was re-organized into the Province of Lower Silesia of the Free State of Prussia consisting of the Breslau and Liegnitz regions. In the interwar period, there were multiple instances of anti-Polish violence in the German part, and already in 1920 a Polish consulate in Wrocław was attacked and demolished by German nationalists. In the 1930s Poles and Jews were increasingly persecuted in the German-controlled part of the region.

World War II

During World War II the Germans established the Gross-Rosen concentration camp with around 100 subcamps in the region, in which around 125,000 people of various nationalities, among them mostly Jews, Poles and citizens of the Soviet Union, were imprisoned, and around 40,000 died. Also several German prisoner-of-war camps, including Stalag VIII-A, Stalag VIII-C, Stalag VIII-E, Stalag Luft III, Oflag VIII-B, Oflag VIII-F, with numerous forced labour subcamps were located in the region, as well as various subcamps of the Stalag VIII-B/344 POW camp. POWs of various nationalities were held in those camps, including Poles, Frenchmen, Belgians, Britons, Italians, Canadians, Americans, Greeks, Yugoslavians, Russians, Australians, New Zealanders, South Africans, Norwegians, Lithuanians, Slovaks, etc. In the final stages of the war it was the site of several death marches perpetrated by Nazi Germany.

In view of Polish claims to the area, a memorandum prepared by the United States Department of State in May 1945 recommended that the area stay with Germany because there was "no historic or ethnic justification" for granting this land to Poland.

However, according to Soviet insistence at the Potsdam Agreement, in which the Soviet Union annexed most of the eastern Poland, Lower Silesia went to the Republic of Poland. These border shifts were agreed on pending a final peace conference with Germany which eventually never took place. Germany retained the small portion of the former Prussian Province of Lower Silesia to the west of the Oder-Neisse line.

Modern Poland 
The remaining German population was expelled from the bulk of Lower Silesia east of the Neisse in accordance with the Potsdam Agreement. Poles from Central Poland and the Polish areas annexed by the Soviet Union came to the region.

From 1945 to 1975 Lower Silesia was administered within the Wrocław Voivodeship. As a result of the Local Government Reorganisation Act (1975), Poland's administration was reorganized into 49 voivodeships, four of them in Lower Silesia: Jelenia Góra, Legnica, Wałbrzych, and Wrocław Voivodeships (1975–1998). As a result of the Local Government Reorganisation Act of 1998, these four provinces were joined into the Lower Silesian Voivodeship (effective 1 January 1999), whose capital is Wrocław.

Population
At the close of the classical period the region was inhabited by Germanic Tribes, who during the Migration Period moved westward to the lands of modern Germany and France and were replaced in Lower Silesia by Lechitic tribes. Centuries later, German settlers came to Lower Silesia during the Late Middle Ages, attracted by newly founded towns to develop the region. Over time, the autochthonous Polish population became partly Germanised and took up the German language as well, however, notable Polish communities survived, especially in northern Lower Silesia, and in larger cities. In year 1819, the Breslau Regency had 833,253 inhabitants, the majority of whom—755,553 (90%)—were German-speakers; with a Polish-speaking minority numbering 66,500 (8%); as well as 3,900 Czechs (1%) and 7,300 Jews (1%). U.S. Immigration Commission in 1911 classified Polish-speaking Silesians as ethnic Poles. After World War II, German inhabitants that had not fled the area due to the war, were expelled, and the region was resettled by Poles from former eastern Poland, which was annexed by the Soviet Union, as well as from other regions, making Polish minority majority again. In 1948–1954 Greeks and Macedonians, refugees of the Greek Civil War, came to Lower Silesia. They were temporarily admitted in five towns and villages in the region and afterwards finally settled in various cities and counties, although in the next decades some returned to Greece, and some emigrated to other countries. The largest Greek-Macedonian communities were located in Zgorzelec, Wrocław, Świdnica and Wałbrzych.

Cities and towns 

Towns with over 20,000 inhabitants:
 Wrocław
 Zielona Góra
 Wałbrzych
 Legnica
 Jelenia Góra
 Lubin
 Głogów
 Świdnica
 Bolesławiec
 Nowa Sól
 Oleśnica
 Brzeg
 Dzierżoniów
 Oława
 Bielawa
 Żagań
 Jawor
 Świebodzice
 Polkowice
 Nowa Ruda
 Świebodzin
 Jelcz-Laskowice

Silesian traditions in Upper Lusatia 

Eastern parts of Upper Lusatia also formed part of Silesia in the early 14th century, as part of the Duchy of Jawor of fragmented Poland, and again from 1815 to 1945, when the area was annexed from Saxony by Prussia and included within the Province of Silesia and later of Lower Silesia. During this time Silesian culture and the Silesian German dialect spread into this region with its centre Görlitz. The expulsion of the Germans from the east of the Oder-Neisse line led to an additional settlement of German Silesians in this region.

Due to these facts, some of the inhabitants of this region still consider themselves Silesian and cultivate Silesian customs. One of their special privileges is the right to use the Lower Silesian flag and coat of arms which is guaranteed to them by the Saxon Constitution of 1992. The Evangelical Church of Silesia in Upper Lusatia, meanwhile, merged with the one of Berlin and Brandenburg to form the Evangelical Church of Berlin-Brandenburg-Silesian Upper Lusatia.

Towns 
The main cities within the former province of Lower Silesia west of the Oder-Neisse line are (Upper Sorbian names in italics):

 Görlitz (Zhorjelc)
 Hoyerswerda (Wojerecy)
 Weißwasser/O.L. (Běła Woda)
 Niesky (Niska)

The main Lusatian cities within the former Duchy of Jawor and province of Lower Silesia east of Lusatian Neisse, now within Lower Silesian Voivodship are:
 Zgorzelec (formerly part of Görlitz)
 Lubań
 Bogatynia

Tourism 

The international airport is located in Wrocław – Wrocław – Copernicus Airport.

The A4 motorway and A18 motorway run through Lower Silesia.

Lower Silesia is one of the most visited regions in Poland. It is famous for a large number of castles and palaces (more than 100), inter alia: Książ Castle, Czocha Castle, Grodziec Castle, Gola Dzierżoniowska Castle, Oleśnica Castle, Kamieniec Ząbkowicki Palace. There is also a lot in the Jelenia Góra valley.

The most widely visited city is Wrocław where the Festival of Good Beer is held every year on the second weekend of June.

Other highlights:
Kłodzko Fortress, Fort Srebrna Góra, Project Riese, Wambierzyce, Legnickie Pole, Oleśnica Mała, Lubiąż Abbey, Krzeszów, Henryków, Vang Stave Church, Churches of Peace, Mount Ślęża, Table Mountains, Owl Mountains, Karkonosze, Main Sudetes Trail (440 km from Świeradów Zdrój to Prudnik), Barycz Valley Landscape Park.

Sport 

Among the most accomplished sports clubs in Lower Silesia are football clubs Śląsk Wrocław and Zagłębie Lubin, speedway clubs Falubaz Zielona Góra and Sparta Wrocław, basketball clubs Śląsk Wrocław, Basket Zielona Góra, Górnik Wałbrzych and handball club Śląsk Wrocław.

Every year in September, Wrocław Marathon is organized.

See also 

 Koleje Dolnośląskie
 Izera railway
 Silesia Walls
 Chrobry fortified village in Szprotawa
 Project Riese

References

Sources 
 Urbanek M., (2003), Dolny Śląsk. Siedem stron świata., MAK publishing, Wrocław, p. 240 + CD-ROM
 Śląsk na weekend – touristic guide, Pascal publishing

External links 

 Lower Silesian Voivodeship Website
 Lower Silesian official website for tourist information

Czech geographic history
Historical regions in Poland